Remixed is a greatest hits/remix album by dance/pop singer Amber. It was released in 2000 and has hits from the albums This Is Your Night and Amber. It also includes a new song entitled Taste The Tears. The album contains 14 songs in total with each song having two versions. The only two songs that don't have a second remix are "Colour of Love" and "One More Night".

Track listings
 "Taste The Tears (Thunderpuss Original Mix)"
 "Love One Another (Pathos Original Mix)"
 "Sexual (Li Da Di) (Deep Dish Cheez Whiz Mix) (Edit)"
 "Above The Clouds (Eric Kupper Remx)"
 "If You Could Read My Mind (Hex Hector Remix)"
 "One More Night (Hani Remix)"
 "This Is Your Night (Mousse T Remix)"
 "Colour Of Love (Mousse T & Borris Dlugosh Remix)"
 "If You Could Read My Mind (Hex Hector Epic Piano Mix)"
 "This Is Your Night (Junior Vasquez Sunday Night Bump Extended Mix)"
 "Above The Clouds (Thunderpuss Remix)"
 "Taste The Tears (Thunderpuss Remix)"
 "Love One Another (Mystica Remix)"
 "Sexual (Li Da Di) (Plasma Trance Mix)"

The Hits Remixed - Extended 

The Hits Remixed - Extended was released internationally to digital download platforms on June 17, 2022.  The album peaked at #2 on Amazon's Digital Dance Albums chart and #3 on iTunes Dance Albums chart.

Track listings

 "A1	Love One Another (Junior Vasquez Trance To Dance Remix)10:56"
 "A2	Taste The Tears (Thunderpuss Dark Club Remix) 7:27"
 "B	Sexual (Li Da Di) (Deep Dish Cheez Whiz Remix) 10:26"
 "C1	Sexual (Li Da Di) (Plasma Trance Remix) 7:28"
 "C2	Above The Clouds (Thunderpuss Remix) 5:57"
 "D1	If You Could Read My Mind (Hex Hector Remix) 9:23"
 "D2	One More Night (Hani Num Remix) 6:54"
 "E1	This Is Your Night (Junior Vasquez Sunday Night Bump Mix) 8:45"
 "E2	This Is Your Night (Mousse T Remix) 6:34"
 "F1	Colour Of Love (Mousse T & Borris Dlugosh Remix) 6:07"
 "F2	Colour Of Love (Jonathan Peters & Anthony Acid Trenergy Hard Remix) 7:08"

Amber (singer) albums
2000 remix albums
Tommy Boy Records remix albums